Te Anga is a rural community in the Waitomo District and Waikato region of New Zealand's North Island.

Marokopa River runs through the area. The river is not safe to swim in due to high rates of E. coli, but farmers have put in plans to reduce water pollution.

The area transitioned from sheep farming to more intensive dairy farming at the turn of the century.

The local landscape consists of limestones, calcareous mudstones and sandstones, with small areas of basal conglomerates and coal measures.

Te Anga is in meshblocks 1018799, 1019601 and 4002699, which had a population of 129 people in the 2018 census.

Marokopa Falls and Mangapohue Natural Bridge are close to Te Anga.

Education

References

Waitomo District
Populated places in Waikato